My.com is an international subsidiary of VK that offers Internet-related services and products. My.com is working under brands and services myMail, myChat and Maps.Me.  My.com is headquartered in Amsterdam, Netherlands, with a U.S. office located in Mountain View, California.

Products

myMail 
myMail is a mobile email app designed to replace native iOS and Android built-in platforms by connecting a user’s existing email accounts in one place, and also offering new @my.com e-mail addresses. It features real-time, customizable push notifications.  In 2014, myMail won an Award of Distinction in the mobile app/productivity category of The Communicator Awards.

myChat 
myChat is a mobile instant messenger for Android, iOS and Windows Phone, offering text, voice and video messaging.

GuideWithMe 
GuideWithMe are offline travel guides based on Wikivoyage open data.

References

Internet properties established in 2012
Webmail
Web mapping
Online video game services
Video game companies of Russia